Henry Gillies Livingstone  (12 September 1890 – 12 February 1959) was a New Zealand politician from Christchurch. He was appointed a member of the New Zealand Legislative Council on 22 June 1950.

Biography
Born on 12 September 1890, Livingstone was the son of Thomas and Mary Ann Livingstone. He was active in the Reform Party and was an early advocate for uniting non-Labour parties into a single party.

Livingstone was appointed as a member of the "suicide squad" nominated by the First National Government in 1950 to vote for the abolition of the Council. Most of the new members (like Livingstone) were appointed on 22 June 1950, and served until 31 December 1950 when the Council was abolished.

In 1935, he was awarded the King George V Silver Jubilee Medal. In the 1954 Queen's Birthday Honours, Livingstone was appointed an Officer of the Order of the British Empire, for services to local government.

Livingstone died on 12 February 1959, and was buried at Waimairi Cemetery, Christchurch.

Notes

References

1890 births
1959 deaths
Members of the New Zealand Legislative Council
Reform Party (New Zealand) politicians
New Zealand National Party MLCs
New Zealand Officers of the Order of the British Empire
20th-century New Zealand politicians
Burials at Waimairi Cemetery